Åsa Lind (born 1958 in Karbäcken in Tåsjö parish in Ångermanland) is a Swedish children's and youth book author.

Lind lives in Stockholm. She has previously worked as a journalist and in a restaurant but is now a full-time writer. Lind was awarded the Nils Holgersson plaque in 2003 and received the Kulla-Gulla Prize in 2014. Lind is a member of the Swedish Children's Book Academy.

Bibliography 
  1995 -  Troll-Tula och Nisse 
  1998 -  Your own flora  (illustrator with Maj Fagerberg)
 2001 -  Rock, stone and sand 
  2002 -  The Sand Wolf  (translated into eighteen languages, including Korean, German and Turkish)
 2002 -  Angels exist  (illustration Sara Lundberg)
 2003 -  Mera Sandvargen 
 2004 -  The Sand Wolf and all the glory 
  2004 -  Princess Book 
 2005 - "Abracadabra"
  2008 -  Ellika Tomson's first book 
  2009 -  The Book of Chance 
  2009 -  Dunderlund's best letter  (illustrator with Sara Lundberg)
  2012 -  Grandma's shawl  (illustrator with Joanna Hellgren)
  2014 -  Excursion book for rhymes and rhymes  (illustrator Anna Bengtsson)
  2014 -  The Secret  (illustrator Emelie Östergren)
 2015 - Opus Olsson and the Brothers of Death
  2015 -  Äskil eats trees 
 2016 -  Dodo and Diamond eat biscuits  (illustrator Malin Koort)

References 

Swedish-language writers
1958 births
Living people